Asarum europaeum, commonly known as asarabacca, European wild ginger, hazelwort, and wild spikenard, is a species of flowering plant in the birthwort family Aristolochiaceae, native to large parts of temperate Europe, and also cultivated in gardens. It is a creeping evergreen perennial with glossy green, kidney shaped leaves and solitary dull purple flowers hidden by the leaves.  Though its roots have a ginger aroma, it is not closely related to the true culinary ginger Zingiber officinale, which originates in tropical Asian rainforests. It is sometimes harvested for use as a spice or a flavoring. In former days, it was used in snuff and also medicinally as an emetic and cathartic.

Description
The leaves are about 10 cm wide. The upper surface of the leaves is shiny, and they have a pepper-like taste and smell. There are also 2 to 3 stipules present that occur in two rows opposite each other on the stem. The flowers are solitary, terminal and nodding. The flower tube is composed of fused tepals that ends with 3 petal-like projections that are brownish towards their ends and dark purple toward the centre. There are 12 stamens present. The flowers emerge in the late winter and spring.

Distribution and habitat
Asarum europaeum has a wide distribution in Europe. It ranges from southern Finland and northern Russia south to southern France, Italy, Croatia, Bosnia and Herzegovina, North Macedonia and Bulgaria. It is absent from the British Isles and Scandinavia, and also from northwestern Germany and the Netherlands. Within Europe, the plant is grown outside of its range in the United Kingdom, Denmark, Sweden, Norway and the Netherlands.

It occurs mostly in deciduous woodland or coniferous forests, especially in calcareous (chalky) soils.

Subspecies
There are two recognised subspecies other than the type, including A. europaeum ssp. caucasicum, which is confined to the southwestern Alps, and A. europaeum ssp. italicum, which is found in central and northern Italy as well as in the Skopska Crna Gora mountains of North Macedonia and Kosovo.

Cultivation
A. europaeum is quite shade-tolerant and is often employed as groundcover where little else will grow. This plant has gained the Royal Horticultural Society's Award of Garden Merit.

Photo gallery

References

External links

Profile at Botanical.com

europaeum
Herbs
Medicinal plants of Europe
Plants described in 1753
Taxa named by Carl Linnaeus